Qik-e Pain (also Romanized as Qīḵ-e Pā’īn , Qehk-e Pā’īn, Qahak-e Pā’īn, and Qehak Pā’īn; also known as Qīḵ-e Soflá) is a village in Darmian Rural District, in the Central District of Darmian County, South Khorasan Province, Iran. At the 2006 census, its population was 164, in 46 families.

References 

Populated places in Darmian County